Drosera yutajensis is a rare species in the carnivorous plant genus Drosera. This species was first collected in 1987 but was not formally described until Rodrigo Duno de Stefano and Alastair Culham published it in a 1995 volume of Novon. Drosera yutajensis is closely related to D. villosa and D. arenicola.

See also 
List of Drosera species
Taxonomy of Drosera

References

yutajensis
Endemic flora of Venezuela
Guayana Highlands
Carnivorous plants of South America
Plants described in 1995